Moose Mountain is a peak in the Sawtooth Mountains of northeastern Minnesota in the United States.

Notes

Mountains of Cook County, Minnesota
Mountains of Minnesota